Serafina Astafieva (Russian: Серафима Александровна Астафьева; 1876 – 13 September 1934) was a Russian dancer and ballet teacher.

Astafieva was a pupil at the Bolshoi Kamenny Theatre School and in 1895 graduated from the Mariinsky Ballet School. In 1896 she married Jozef Kshessinsky a famous character dancer. From 1909-1911 Astafieva performed with Sergei Diaghilev's Ballets Russes. After retiring from performing she opened the Russian Dancing Academy at The Pheasantry on King's Road in Chelsea, London. Her pupils included Anton Dolin, Margot Fonteyn, Alicia Markova, Hermione Darnborough, Madeleine Vyner, and Joan Lawson.

A blue plaque unveiled in 1968 commemorates Astafieva at 152 King's Road in Chelsea.

She is referenced as "Grishkin" in T. S. Eliot's poem Whispers of Immortality.

See also
 List of Russian ballet dancers

References 

1876 births
1934 deaths
Dancers from Saint Petersburg
Ballerinas from the Russian Empire
Ballet teachers
Emigrants from the Russian Empire to the United Kingdom
King's Road, Chelsea, London